Aziz Ali (born September 15, 1980) is a Kenyan amateur boxer who qualified for the 2008 Olympics at light-heavyweight at the 2nd AIBA African 2008 Olympic Qualifying Tournament despite being knocked out by Bastie Samir in the last fight. At the Olympics, he lost his first bout 3:8 to Turkey's Bahram Muzaffer.

References

External links
Qualifier
sports-reference

Living people
Light-heavyweight boxers
Boxers at the 2008 Summer Olympics
Olympic boxers of Kenya
1980 births
Kenyan male boxers